Ade Kali is a village in Rurka Kalan.  Jalandhar is a district of Indian state of Punjab.

About 
AdeKali lies on the Bundala-Nurmahal road at a distance of 1 km from it.  The nearest railway station to Ade Kali is Nurmahal railway station at a distance of 6 km.

Post code 
AdeKali's Post office is Bundala whose post code is 144034.

References 

   A Punjabi site with Ade Kali's details

Villages in Jalandhar district